Oddbods (also known as The Oddbods Show) is a Singaporean computer-animated comedy television series produced by One Animation. The series centers on seven characters—Bubbles, Pogo, Newt, Jeff, Slick, Fuse and Zee—wearing furry suits of different colors. The characters make sounds but there is no dialogue, making the series easily translatable and international.

The series debuted in 2013, and the first season ended in 2015. Each season has 60 episodes. Season two followed in 2016. A third season was released on Netflix on April 4, 2022. Each episode is relatively short, and various formats have been broadcast, including one-, five-, and seven-minute episodes.

Series overview

Episode list

Season 1

Season 2

Season 3

Specials

Notes

References

External links
 
 Oddbods Youtube Channel
 Oddbods Facebook Page
 Oddbods Instagram Page
 One Animation website
 

Boomerang (TV network) original programming
ITV children's television shows
Disney Channels Worldwide original programming
Computer-animated television series
Singaporean animated television series
2014 Singaporean television series debuts
2010s animated television series
Animated television series without speech